Schindler is a German surname.

Schindler may also refer to:

 Schindler Group, Swiss manufacturer of elevators, escalators, and moving walkways
 Schindler Elevator Corporation, an American offshoot
 Schindlerjuden (Schindler Jews), Jews saved by Oskar Schindler
 11572 Schindler, a minor planet

See also
 Schindler's list
 China's Schindler (disambiguation)
 
 Schindleria
 Shidler
 Shindler (disambiguation)